Dr. Fayeq Hamdi Tahboub serves as the International Commissioner of the Palestinian Scout Association.

In 1998, Tahboub was awarded the 267th Bronze Wolf, the only distinction of the World Organization of the Scout Movement, awarded by the World Scout Committee for exceptional services to world Scouting.

See also

References

External links
Palestinian Scout Association official website
complete list 

Recipients of the Bronze Wolf Award
Year of birth missing
Scouting and Guiding in the State of Palestine